Khalilpur Amru is a village situated on the Moradabad-Haridwar highway (SH49). It forms part of the Bhikanpur gram panchayat. According to the 2011 census of India, its population was 1,366, comprising 699 males and 667 females.

References 

Villages in Moradabad district